Shri Gujarathi Vidhyalaya High School is one of the oldest schools in Kerala State, India. The school is managed by Shri Cochin Gujarathi Mahajan, Mattancherry.

References

High schools and secondary schools in Kochi
Mattancherry